Failure is the first studio album by Maine hardcore punk band Outbreak. It was released in 2006 on Bridge 9 Records.

Track listing

References

2006 debut albums
Outbreak (band) albums
Think Fast! Records albums
Bridge 9 Records albums